The Swimming portion of the 13th FINA World Aquatics Championships was held at the Foro Italico sports complex in Rome, Italy from Sunday 26 July – Sunday 2 August 2009. It featured 40 long course (50m) events (20 for males, 20 for females; 17 individual events and 3 relays for each gender).

Competition schedule
The evening session schedule for the 2009 Worlds was:

Note: prelims/semifinals/finals were swum in events 200 m and shorter; prelims/finals in events 400 m or longer. For prelims/semifinals/finals events, prelims and semis were held on the same day, with finals being the evening of the following day. For the 400 m events and the 800 m relays, prelims and finals were held the same day. For the individual 800 m and 1500 m races, prelims were in the morning of one day, with finals in the evening of the next day. Preliminary sessions began at 9:00 a.m.; finals at 6:00 p.m.

Medal table

Medal winners

Men's events

Legend:   Swimmers who participated in the heats only and received medals.

Women's eventsLegend:   Swimmers who participated in the heats only and received medals.

Records
The following world and championship records were broken during the competition.

World records

Championship records

See also
2009 in swimming
Swimming at the 2007 World Aquatics Championships
Swimming at the 2008 Summer Olympics

References

Omega Timing Book of Results

 
World Aquatics Championships
Swimming at the World Aquatics Championships
2009 World Aquatics Championships

es:Campeonato Mundial de Natación de 2009